Zeiger  is a surname of German origin. Notable people with the surname include:

 Larry King, born Lawrence Harvey Zeiger. American television and radio host.
 Hans Zeiger. United States politician and member of Washington State Senate.
 Joanna Zeiger. United States triathlete.
 David Zeiger. Brazilian industrialist.
 Mila Zeiger. Brazilian businesswoman. 
 Roni Zeiger. United States physician.
 Eliezer (Eduardo) Zeiger. United States biologist. 
 David Zeiger. United States film director and producer.
 Yitzhak Seiger. Israeli politician
 Igor Zeiger. Israeli artist

German-language surnames